KVCY (104.7 FM) is a radio station broadcasting a Christian format. Licensed to Fort Scott, Kansas, United States, it serves the Pittsburg area.  The station is currently owned by VCY America, Inc.. KVCY is also heard in the Joplin, Missouri area on 106.3 FM, through translator station K292FX.

Programming
KVCY's programming includes Christian Talk and Teaching programming including; Crosstalk, Worldview Weekend with Brannon Howse, Grace to You with John MacArthur, In Touch with Dr. Charles Stanley, Love Worth Finding with Adrian Rogers, Revive Our Hearts with Nancy Leigh DeMoss, The Alternative with Tony Evans, Liberty Council's Faith and Freedom Report, Thru the Bible with J. Vernon McGee, Joni and Friends, Unshackled!, and Moody Radio's Stories of Great Christians.

KVCY also airs a variety of vocal and instrumental traditional Christian music, as well as children's programming such as Ranger Bill.

Translator

References

External links
 
 
 

VCY
Moody Radio affiliate stations
Radio stations established in 1983
1983 establishments in Kansas
VCY America stations